Jacob Meltzer (21 October 1898–16 December 1976) was a New Zealand lawyer, unionist, coroner and community leader. He was born in Newcastle upon Tyne, Northumberland, England, on 21 October 1898.

References

1898 births
1976 deaths
New Zealand Jews
New Zealand people of German-Jewish descent
New Zealand trade unionists
British emigrants to New Zealand
English Jews
English people of German-Jewish descent
People from Newcastle upon Tyne